Manchester Exchange was a railway station in Salford, England, immediately north of Manchester city centre, which served the city between 1884 and 1969. The main approach road ran from the end of Deansgate, near Manchester Cathedral, passing over the River Irwell, the Manchester-Salford boundary and Chapel Street; a second approach road led up from Blackfriars Road. Most of the station was in Salford, with only the 1929 extension to platform 3 east of the Irwell in Manchester.

Construction and opening

The station was built by the London and North Western Railway (LNWR) and opened on 30 June 1884. The station had five platforms: 1 and 2 were bays and 3, 4 and 5 were through. Platforms 4 and 5 were reached by a footbridge from near the station entrance. The opening of Exchange allowed the LNWR to vacate Manchester Victoria station to the east, which it (and its predecessors, including the Liverpool and Manchester Railway) had shared with the Lancashire and Yorkshire Railway (and its predecessors) since 4 May 1844.

Services

Exchange station served trains to Liverpool Lime Street, Huddersfield, Leeds, Hull Paragon and Newcastle Central; also Warrington Bank Quay, Chester and North Wales. Local LNWR passenger trains operated via Walkden to Bolton Great Moor Street and via Tyldesley to Wigan North Western. 

The station originally provided alternative services from Manchester to London Euston. Between 1884 and 1943, the Great Western Railway operated a competing passenger train service from Chester General station via Frodsham, Warrington Bank Quay and Eccles to Manchester Exchange.

Second World War damage

The station suffered hits by several German incendiary bombs during the Christmas 1940 Manchester Blitz. On 22 December, the station roof was severely damaged, portions of which were never replaced. Fires took extensive hold on the building which could not be re-opened for passengers until 13 January 1941.

Closure
The railway station was closed on 5 May 1969 and all remaining services were redirected to Manchester Victoria.

Despite closure, the station remained operational for newspaper trains until the 1980s. Manchester produced several 'northern editions' until the newspaper revolution. The nighttime operation was very busy with several trains being loaded and readied for departure to various trans-Pennine destinations (Halifax / Huddersfield / Leeds / York etc.).

After many years of remaining relatively intact (with trains still running beneath the train shed until the track layout was redesigned), it continued to operate as a car park for some years.

In July 2017, Q-Park opened a brand new car park called Deansgate North, restoring the original red brickwork of the Exchange Station.

Location map

References

Notes

Bibliography

External links 
 A leaflet from the late 1920s, advertising period excursions to North Wales from Manchester Exchange
 History page, including photographs, at Disused-stations.org.uk

Disused railway stations in Salford
Former London and North Western Railway stations
Railway stations in Great Britain opened in 1884
Railway stations in Great Britain closed in 1969